Notable events of 2021 in webcomics.

Events

Awards
 Eisner Awards, "Best Webcomic" won by Simon Hanselmann's Crisis Zone
 Harvey Awards, "Digital Book of the Year" won by Rachel Smythe's Lore Olympus
 Ignatz Awards, "Outstanding Online Comic" won by Michael DeForge's Birds of Maine
 Next Manga Award, "Web Manga" won by Naoya Matsumoto's Kaiju No. 8

Webcomics started

 April 30 — Don't Stop My Beautification by Mana Aizen
 July 30 — Midnight Poppy Land by Lilydusk

Webcomics ended
 Crossdressing Pandemic by Mikuzu Shinagawa, 2019–2021
 Devil Number 4 by Jang-jin and Woombeee, 2018–2021
 Mr. Boop by Alec Robbins, 2020–2021
 My Dear Cold-Blooded King by lifelight, 2017–2021
 Senpai wa Otokonoko by Pom, 2019–2021
 Solo Leveling by Chugong, 2016–2021

References

 
Webcomics by year